Toswel Kaua (born 28 August 1947 in Lau, Malaita Province; died 15 November 2010 in Honiara) was a Solomon Islands politician, several times Cabinet minister, and Deputy Prime Minister from May to November 2007.

He studied first at the University of Sydney (Australia), where he obtained a Certificate in Administration, Management and Systems. He then obtained a Certificate in Teaching from the Solomon Islands Teachers College, followed by a Diploma in Education and a Post-Graduate Diploma in Education from the University of Newcastle upon Tyne (England). He completed his studies with a Post-Graduate Certificate in Teaching from the University of Oxford, and began a career in teaching and administration.

He taught at St. Nicholas primary school, in Solomon Islands, before becoming the school's headmaster. He then entered public administration as Assistant Education Officer for Selection and Guidance at the Ministry of Education. He went on to serve as Chief Administrative Officer for Regulation at the Ministry of Public Service, Assistant Secretary for Personnel to the Prime Minister's Office, Under-Secretary at the Public Service Division, Deputy Secretary to the Prime Minister and Cabinet, then Permanent Secretary to a number of Ministries, before becoming Secretary to the Prime Minister and Cabinet.

He began his political career when he was elected to Parliament as the member for Baegu/Asifola in the April 2006 general election. In May, Prime Minister Snyder Rini's government resigned in the face of public protest and under threat of a motion of no confidence, and Manasseh Sogavare ascended to the premiership. Sogavare appointed Kaua to Cabinet, as Minister for Mines and Energy. He subsequently appointed him Minister for Agriculture and Livestock, then Deputy Prime Minister and Minister for Public Service. In November 2007, however, Kaua resigned from Cabinet and joined the Opposition. The following month, Sogavare's government was ousted in a vote of no confidence, and Kaua was appointed Minister for Justice and Legal Affairs by new Prime Minister Derek Sikua, a position which he held until August 2010.

He retained his seat in Parliament in the August 2010 general election, and served as a government backbencher for the remaining months of his life. On 15 November 2010, he died in hospital following a "long illness".

References

1947 births
2010 deaths
Members of the National Parliament of the Solomon Islands
People from Malaita Province
Government ministers of the Solomon Islands
Alumni of the University of Oxford
University of Sydney alumni
Justice ministers of the Solomon Islands
Energy ministers of the Solomon Islands
Mining ministers of the Solomon Islands
Deputy Prime Ministers of the Solomon Islands